The 2006–07 Oral Roberts Golden Eagles men's basketball team represented Oral Roberts University during the 2006–07 NCAA Division I men's basketball season. The Golden Eagles, led by 8th year head coach Scott Sutton, played their home games at the Mabee Center and were members of Mid-Continent Conference. They finished the season 23–11, 12–2 in league play to be crowned regular season champions. They won the Mid-Continent Conference tournament to receive an automatic bid to the NCAA tournament as No. 14 seed in the East region. The Golden Eagles lost to No. 3 seed Washington State in the opening round.

Roster

Schedule and results

|-
!colspan=9 style=| Exhibition

|-
!colspan=9 style=| Non-Conference regular season

|-
!colspan=9 style=| Mid-Con Conference regular season

|-
!colspan=9 style=| Mid-Con Conference tournament

|-
!colspan=9 style=| NCAA tournament

References

Oral Roberts Golden Eagles men's basketball seasons
Oral Roberts
Oral Roberts
2006 in sports in Oklahoma
2007 in sports in Oklahoma